Route 74, also known as Heart's Content Highway, is a  east–west highway on the Avalon Peninsula of Newfoundland. It connects the towns of Heart's Content and Victoria, with no other major intersections or communities along the highway besides at its two termini, Route 80 (Trinity Road) in Heart's Content, and Route 70 (Conception Bay Highway) in Victoria.

Major intersections

References

074